Buq Aqable, also spelled Buqda, is a District in the central Hiiran region of Somalia population about 50,000 people living in Buq Aqable constantly. The town was established in early 16th century by elders of Gaaljecel clan and it is the base for the Gaaljecel clan leader (Ugaas).

Overview

In March 2014, Somali Armed Forces assisted by AMISOM troops captured the town from Al-Shabaab. The offensive was part of an intensified military operation by the allied forces to remove the insurgent group from the remaining areas in southern Somalia under its control. In September 2015, Al-Shabaab retakes the city from Somalia Armed Forces.

Notes

References

Buqdaaqable

Populated places in Hiran, Somalia